The Blue Yonder EZ King Cobra is a Canadian designed and built, single-engined, single-seat aircraft provided as a completed aircraft or in kit form by Blue Yonder Aviation. The aircraft is approximately a 60% scale replica of the Second World War Bell P-63 Kingcobra fighter.

The aircraft can be constructed in Canada as a basic ultra-light, or amateur-built aircraft, but is not currently available as an advanced ultra-light.

Development
The EZ King Cobra was designed by Wayne Winters of Indus, Alberta and based on the earlier EZ Merlin. The project was started as a customer request for an ultralight category scale replica of a fighter and was later offered as a commercially available kit aircraft.

Winters created the EZ King Cobra by designing a new cantilever wing based on the Merlin wing, itself based on the Lazair wing design. The fuselage is constructed of welded 4130 steel tube and has a canopy and fin that resembles the original fighter design. The aircraft retained the Junker's ailerons of the original Merlin wing along with the Clark "Y" airfoil and construction featuring a leading edge "D" cell and foam ribs.

The prototype of the new design flew in 1998.

The EZ King Cobra can accommodate a variety of powerplants:

Rotax 503 
Rotax 582 
Rotax 912

Operational history
Despite being widely demonstrated no further orders have been received for the type and the prototype remains the sole flying example.

Specifications (Rotax 582)

See also

References

External links
 Blue Yonder Aviation
 Photo of the EZ King Cobra prototype
 Top view photo of the EZ King Cobra prototype

Low-wing aircraft
EZ King Cobra
1990s Canadian ultralight aircraft
Homebuilt aircraft
Replica aircraft
Single-engined tractor aircraft
Aircraft first flown in 1998